Flywheel, Shyster, and Flywheel is a BBC Radio 4 1990 situation comedy radio show, adapted from a 1932 American radio show of the same name. The original series starred two of the Marx Brothers, Groucho and Chico, and was written primarily by Nat Perrin and Arthur Sheekman. It depicted the misadventures of a small law firm, with Groucho acting as attorney Waldorf T. Flywheel, and Chico playing Flywheel's assistant Emmanuel Ravelli. In 1988 the show scripts were rediscovered in the US Library of Congress, and were adapted by the BBC two years later. The lead roles are performed by professional Marx Brothers soundalikes: Michael Roberts as Groucho's Flywheel and Frank Lazarus as Chico's Ravelli. Other cast members include Lorelei King playing all the female roles, with Vincent Marzello (Lorelei's husband), Spike Milligan and Dick Vosburgh guest starring. During the recording sessions, on occasions Michael Roberts (as Groucho) would adlib certain comments and these were left in the final recordings. 

The scripts for the 1990 series were adapted by Mark Brisenden for a modern British audience, and the performances were directed by Dirk Maggs. Rather than each episode being a direct remake of an individual American episode, the 1990 episodes often included material from two or even three different 1932 episodes, and occasionally with additional jokes from Marx Brothers' films. The success of the first series led to another two series being produced.

Episode list

References

Sources

External links

 BBC adaptation director's website details for series 1, series 2 and series 3.
Flywheel, Shyster and Flywheel at britishcomedy.org.uk

BBC Radio comedy programmes
BBC Radio 4 programmes
Cultural depictions of the Marx Brothers
1990 radio programme debuts
1992 radio programme endings